Benjamin Rey Schauer (May 9, 1891 – March 5, 1977) was an American attorney and Associate Justice of the Supreme Court of California from December 18, 1942, to September 15, 1965.

Biography
Born in Santa Maria, California, Schauer received an A.B. from Occidental College in 1912, and read law to be admitted to the California State Bar in July 1913. He attended the University of Southern California Law School in 1916, and received a J.D. from Southwestern University School of Law, 1916. He was in private practice from 1913 to 1927, also serving in the U.S. Naval Reserve, where he achieved the rank of Lieutenant Commander.

Schauer was appointed by Governor C.C. Young as a judge on the Los Angeles County Superior Court, where he served from August 4, 1927, to November 12, 1941. In November 1938, he overturned a contempt conviction against a 24-year old woman who appeared in slacks in Los Angeles Municipal Court to testify in a robbery case, and declined the trial judge's request to change into a skirt. On appeal to the Superior Court, Schauer held the slacks were in "good taste" and not a violation of court protocol.

Schauer was then a Presiding Justice of the California Court of Appeal, Second Appellate District, Division Three, from October 22, 1941, to December 17, 1942.

In December 1942, Governor Culbert Olson appointed Schauer as an associate justice of the California Supreme Court, where he remained for 23 years. On the Supreme Court, Schauer was one of three Justices to dissent from the holding in Perez v. Sharp (1948), in which the court held by a vote of 4 to 3 that interracial bans on marriage violated the Fourteenth Amendment to the United States Constitution and therefore were illegal in California. One month later, Schauer wrote the majority opinion in Hughes v. Superior Court, holding that protesters were making an illegal demand when they sought to have businesses hire employees based on race, solely to achieve a racial balance proportional to that of the patronage of the business.

In August 1964, Schauer announced his retirement from the court effective September 15, 1964.

Personal life

On October 21, 1915, Schauer married Eva Elizabeth Summers, a graduate of the University of Southern California. After her death on January 22, 1969, he remarried to Jean Marion Dewsbury in Los Angeles.

Schauer was a competitive sailor.

See also
 List of justices of the Supreme Court of California

References

External links
B. Rey Schauer. California Supreme Court Historical Society.
 B. Rey Schauer. California Court of Appeals, Second Appellate District, Division Three.
 Court opinions authored by B. Rey Schauer. Courtlistener.com.
 Past & Present Justices. California State Courts. Retrieved July 19, 2017.

1891 births
1977 deaths
20th-century American judges
20th-century American lawyers
U.S. state supreme court judges admitted to the practice of law by reading law
Superior court judges in the United States
Judges of the California Courts of Appeal
Justices of the Supreme Court of California
Lawyers from Los Angeles
People from Santa Maria, California
Occidental College alumni
USC Gould School of Law alumni
Southwestern Law School alumni
United States Navy officers
Military personnel from California